Sina Rural District is in the Central District of Varzaqan County, East Azerbaijan province, Iran. At the National Census of 2006, its population was 6,549 in 1,377 households. There were 5,417 inhabitants in 1,464 households at the following census of 2011. At the most recent census of 2016, the population of the rural district was 5,496 in 1,687 households. The largest of its 32 villages was Awli, with 495 people.

References 

Varzaqan County

Rural Districts of East Azerbaijan Province

Populated places in East Azerbaijan Province

Populated places in Varzaqan County